Inglis Yoana Hernández Toledo (born 17 September 1990) is a Mexican professional football midfielder who plays for Tijuana of the Liga MX Femenil.

References

External links 
 

1990 births
Living people
Mexican women's footballers
Footballers from Sinaloa
Sportspeople from Mazatlán
Liga MX Femenil players
Club Tijuana (women) footballers
Women's association football midfielders
20th-century Mexican women
21st-century Mexican women
Mexican footballers